Sangatsu Manga is a major manga publisher in Finland. It's a division of Tammi Publishers. In 2003 it became the first Finnish publisher to sell manga (Dragon Ball, respectably) in convenience stores and supermarkets, which triggered the current wave of manga publishing in Finland.

Manga published by Sangatsu Manga 
 
 .hack//Legend of the Twilight
 Astro Boy - Tetsuwan Atom
 Attack on Titan
 Bleach
 Chi's Sweet Home
 Dragon Ball
 Dragon Ball Z (Films comic)
 Dream Kiss
 Emma
 Fullmetal Alchemist
 Fruits Basket
 Howl's Moving Castle (Films comic)
 Inspector Akane Tsunemori 
 Kajika
 Naruto
 My Hero Academia 
 Nausicaä of the Valley of the Wind
 Neon Genesis Evangelion
 One Piece
 Sandland
 Tales from Earthsea (Films comic)
 Tokyo Mew Mew
 Tokyo Mew Mew à la Mode
 Trinity Blood
 Your name 
 Yu-Gi-Oh!
 Zodiac P.I.

External links 
 Sangatsu Manga Official site

Manga distributors